Rostislav Dimitrov (born December 26, 1974 in Rousse) is a former triple jumper from Bulgaria, best known for his silver medal at the 1999 World Championships. He originally won the silver medal at the World Indoor Championships the same year, but was disqualified for ephedrin use. His personal best was 17.49 metres.

Achievements

References

External links

1974 births
Living people
Bulgarian male triple jumpers
Bulgarian sportspeople in doping cases
Athletes (track and field) at the 2000 Summer Olympics
Olympic athletes of Bulgaria
Doping cases in athletics
Sportspeople from Ruse, Bulgaria
World Athletics Championships medalists
European Athletics Championships medalists